Hicksville may refer to:

Places
Hicksville, Arkansas
Hicksville, Kentucky, in Graves County
Hicksville, New York
Hicksville station, Long Island Rail Road station in Hicksville, New York
Hicksville, Ohio
Hicksville, Virginia
"Hicksville", early proposed name for the city of Hastings, New Zealand, which was built on land owned by Francis Hicks

Other
Hicksville (graphic novel), by Dylan Horrocks
Hicksville (album), by the band Celtic Cross

See also
"Hickville", a placeholder name for a small, rural community perceived to be populated by hicks or a theoretical remote, small settlement.